East Timor, also known as Timor-Leste and officially as the Democratic Republic of Timor-Leste, competed at the 2020 Summer Olympics in Tokyo. Originally scheduled to take place from 24 July to 9 August 2020, the Games have been postponed to 23 July to 8 August 2021, due to the COVID-19 pandemic. It was the nations fifth appearance at the Summer Olympics.

Competitors
The following is the list of number of competitors in the Games.

Athletics

East Timor received a universality slot from the World Athletics to send a male track and field athlete to the Olympics.

Track & road events

Swimming

East Timor received a universality invitation from FINA to send two top-ranked swimmers (one per gender) in their respective individual events to the Olympics, based on the FINA Points System of June 28, 2021, heralding the nation's debut in the sport.

References

Olympics
2020
Nations at the 2020 Summer Olympics